Lachine station is a commuter rail station operated by Exo in the borough of Lachine, Canada. It is part of the Vaudreuil–Hudson line. It has no connecting bus routes.

 on weekdays, all 11 inbound trains and 12 outbound trains on the line call at this station. On weekends, all trains (four on Saturday and three on Sunday in each direction) call here.

The station is located north of Autoroute 20 at the corner of Avenue Cardinal and Boulevard Pine Beach. The station possesses a shelter on either platform but no station building. The station has two side platforms; access between them is provided by a tunnel with headhouses on either side of the tracks, which crosses under the CN rails and highway to reach the station entrance located at the corner of 48e Avenue and Rue Sir-George-Simpson.

This station was opened as Grovehill station in 1961, and was renamed Lachine in 1989 after a previous station by that name, located to the east, was closed.

References

External links
 Lachine Commuter Train Station Information (RTM)
 Lachine Commuter Train Station Schedule (RTM)
 2016 STM System Map

Exo commuter rail stations
Railway stations in Montreal
Lachine, Quebec